is the third single of J-pop duo FictionJunction Yuuka. It was released on September 22, 2004.

This single includes an insert song of the anime Gundam SEED, composed by Yuki Kajiura. There are two other versions of the song on the single (piano and acoustic), along with its karaoke version.  Its catalog number is VICL-35646. Coincidentally, the insert song of Mobile Suit Gundam SEED Destiny (Gundam SEED's sequel), Honoh no Tobira, was released exactly one year after this single.

Originally, this song was released on "Suit CD vol.4 Miguel Ayman x Nicol Amarfi", an EP from Gundam SEED, under the name "FictionJunction featuring Yuuka". Due to the song's popularity and the fact that September 2004 was Gundam SEED's one-year anniversary, it was later released as a single obtaining the twelfth place on the Oricon charts, which later rose to the tenth. The song has been FictionJunction YUUKA's best-selling single.

Track listing
From Flying Dog.

Charts 
Oricon Sales Chart (Japan)

Cover versions 
The song was covered by Hiroko Moriguchi in 2019 as an Amazon Music exclusive single. It was added as a bonus track in Moriguchi's 2020 album Gundam Song Covers 2.

External links 
Victor Animation Network: discography entry
Romaji lyrics and English translation on AnimeLyrics

References 

2004 singles
2019 singles
2004 songs
FictionJunction Yuuka songs
Songs written by Yuki Kajiura
King Records (Japan) singles
Victor Entertainment singles
Song articles with missing songwriters